Jason Michael Johnson (born October 27, 1973) is a former Major League Baseball pitcher. He throws and bats right-handed.

Career
Johnson graduated from Conner High School in Hebron, Kentucky. He made his major league debut with the Pirates in 1997, appearing in only 3 games. Following the season, he was among the players selected in the draft by the newly created franchise, the Tampa Bay Devil Rays. In his lone season in Tampa Bay, Johnson went 2-5 in 13 starts. From 1999 to 2003, Johnson was with the Baltimore Orioles, 2001 being his best season of his career, going 10-12 with a career low 4.09 ERA. In , he received the Tony Conigliaro Award. 

Johnson signed a two year deal with the Detroit Tigers prior to the 2004 season. In his first season with Detroit, Johnson posted his worst season as a full time starter, going 8-15 with an ERA of 5.13 in 196+ innings. The homer came against Los Angeles Dodgers pitcher Jeff Weaver, at Dodger Stadium. Despite finishing the season 8-13, Johnson lowered his ERA from the previous season and pitched in a career high 210 innings while posting his lowest K/9 of his career, striking out just 93 while inducing 49 walks.

Johnson signed with Cleveland prior to the  season  He fared no better there, going 3-8 with a 5.96 ERA. He was designated for assignment on June 22, 2006. Before he decided whether or not to accept the assignment, he was traded to the Boston Red Sox for cash. In Boston, his time as a member of the Red Sox was disastrous, going 0-4 with a 7.36 ERA. On August 18, 2006, Johnson was designated for assignment by the Red Sox and quickly signed to a minor league contract with the Cincinnati Reds.

He signed an incentive-laden, one-year, $3 million contract with the Seibu Lions for the  season. He pitched one season in Japan, then on February 7, signed a minor league contract with an invitation to spring training with the Los Angeles Dodgers. He failed to make the Dodgers opening day roster and was assigned to the Triple-A Las Vegas 51s. On July 18 the Dodgers added him to the 25-man roster, and he finished the season with them, going 1-2 with an ERA of 5.22. On January 6, he signed a minor league contract with an invitation to spring training with the New York Yankees, where he was expected to compete for the final spot in the starting rotation. Johnson's return was thrown into doubt when he was diagnosed with choroidal melanoma in his right retina. On August 10, 2009 he was released by the Yankees.

He last played for the Amarillo Sox in the American Association of Independent Professional Baseball in 2013.

Johnson has type 1 diabetes and was the first Major League Baseball player to get permission to wear an insulin pump on the field. He wears the pump on his belt on the left side of his lower back, in order to minimize the chance of it being hit by a bat or thrown ball.

References

External links

Baseball players from California
Major League Baseball pitchers
Pittsburgh Pirates players
Tampa Bay Devil Rays players
Baltimore Orioles players
Detroit Tigers players
Cleveland Indians players
Boston Red Sox players
Cincinnati Reds players
Los Angeles Dodgers players
Seibu Lions players
American expatriate baseball players in Japan
Gulf Coast Pirates players
Welland Pirates players
Augusta GreenJackets players
Lynchburg Hillcats players
Carolina Mudcats players
Durham Bulls players
Rochester Red Wings players
Bowie Baysox players
Wilmington Blue Rocks players
Pawtucket Red Sox players
Louisville Bats players
Las Vegas 51s players
Scranton/Wilkes-Barre Yankees players
Trenton Thunder players
Camden Riversharks players
Amarillo Thunderheads players
1973 births
Living people
People from Hebron, Kentucky
People with type 1 diabetes